Escudilla Mountain is located in Apache County, Arizona, and is part of the White Mountains. The peak is approximately 3.5 miles from the Arizona-New Mexico border. The summit is the highest point in the Escudilla Wilderness which is administered as part of the Apache-Sitgreaves National Forest. 

The area was severely impacted by the Wallow Fire of June 2011.

A portion of Aldo Leopold's Sand County Almanac discusses Escudilla and that it was the location of the last grizzly bear killed in Arizona (in 1936).

References

External links 
 
 

White Mountains (Arizona)
Landforms of Apache County, Arizona
Mountains of Arizona
Volcanoes of Arizona
Mountains of Apache County, Arizona